The Codex Lagostinum or Statute of Lastovo, was a legislation of common law written in 1310 by the population of the island of Lagosta (now called Lastovo, in Croatia), which had autonomy under the Republic of Ragusa. The work is written mostly in Italian, but contains a few Latin sentences. There are Slavic personal names present, due to Slavic influx amid disappearance of Dalmatian-speaking population in the former city-states caused by epidemies and wars.

References

Further reading

External links
Povijest Lastova 

1310s in law
Lastovo
History of Dalmatia
14th century in Croatia
Legal history of Croatia
Medieval documents of Croatia
Medieval legal texts
1310 in Europe